Discothyris is a genus of moths of the family Crambidae. It contains only one species, Discothyris ferruginata, which is found in Taiwan and India.

References

Pyraustinae
Crambidae genera
Monotypic moth genera
Taxa named by William Warren (entomologist)